Rick Peckham (born March 1955) is the retired play-by-play broadcaster for the NHL's Tampa Bay Lightning hockey team.  Previously, Peckham had served as the play-by-play announcer for the Hartford Whalers from 1984 through 1995.  He has also broadcast NHL games on ESPN (1987–88) and SportsChannel America (1988–92).  Through 1977–84, he called games on television and radio for the AHL’s Rochester Americans.  Peckham was broadcasting Lightning games with the Florida-based Fox Sports Sun, as well as occasionally doing play-by-play for the NHL on NBC, a role that increased with the passing of Dave Strader. He is a 1977 graduate of Kent State University with a B.A. degree in telecommunications.

Career as a broadcaster
Rochester Americans play-by-play, TV and radio, 1977–84.
Hartford Whalers TV play-by-play, SportsChannel New England, 1984–95 (New England Emmy-award-winning live sports production in 1993).
University of Hartford basketball, 1986–87.
ESPN NHL on ESPN play-by-play, 1987–88.
NHL on SportsChannel America play-by-play, 1988–92.
SportsChannel America college basketball play-by-play, 1991–95.
Tampa Bay Lightning play-by-play, 1995–2020.
ESPN International NFL and NBA telecasts, 1995.
Tampa Bay Storm play-by-play, 1997–02 and 2005.
NHL on Versus/NHL on NBC play-by-play, 2007–2020.

References
 FoxSportsFlorida.com, Sun Sports broadcasters

College basketball announcers in the United States
National Basketball Association broadcasters
National Hockey League broadcasters
Hartford Whalers announcers
Tampa Bay Lightning announcers
Philadelphia Eagles announcers
Living people
American sports announcers
Kent State University alumni
American Hockey League broadcasters
Foster Hewitt Memorial Award winners
1955 births